Sinopieris is a genus of butterflies in the family Pieridae. The genus occurs in Gansu, Nepal, Nanshan, Shaanxi, Sichuan, Tibet and Yunnan. All six species were originally included in Pieris and subsequently in Pontia.

From Pieris, this genus is most easily (though not entirely reliably) by the venation in the apical area of the forewing. Most Sinopieris species have a suffused grey or blackish post-discal band whereas Pieris usually have a single (males) or a pair (females) of blackish post-discal spots on the forewings, and no trace of any spot or band on the hindwings.

Species
Sinopieris davidis (Oberthür, 1876) (Shaanxi, Sichuan, Tibet, Yunnan)
Sinopieris dubernardi (Oberthür, 1884) (Gansu, Nanshan, Shaanxi, Sichuan, Tibet, Yunnan)
Sinopieris kozlovi (Alpheraky, 1897) (Xinjiang)
Sinopieris sherpae (Epstein, 1979) (Nepal)
Sinopieris stoetzneri (Draeseke, 1925) (Sichuan, Yunnan)
Sinopieris venata (Leech, 1891) (Ta-chien-lu, at altitude 3000 m)

References

External links
Sinopieris Butterflies & Moths of the World Generic Names and their Type-species

Pierini
Pieridae genera